The 2018 GT4 Belgium Cup was the first season of the GT4 Belgium Cup, a sports car championship for Belgian drivers only, created and organised by the Stéphane Ratel Organisation (SRO). The season began on 7 April at Zolder and ended on 7 October at Zandvoort.

Calendar
On 15 December 2017, the Stéphane Ratel Organisation announced the first draft of the 2018 calendar. The finalised calendar was announced on 30 March 2017. The round at the Nürburgring in the weekend of 1 July was dropped from the schedule.

Entry list
All drivers are entered under Belgian license.

See also
2018 GT4 European Series
2018 French GT4 Cup
2018 GT4 Central European Cup

References

External links

GT4 European Series
GT4 Belgium
GT4 Belgium